Pegmatite Peak is a peak (790 m) along the west side of Koerwitz Glacier, about midway between the main summits of Medina Peaks and Mount Salisbury, in the Queen Maud Mountains. First mapped by United States Geological Survey (USGS) from surveys and U.S. Navy air photos, 1960–64. So named by New Zealand Geological Survey Antarctic Expedition (NZGSAE), 1969–70, because of the occurrence of large, whitish pegmatite dykes in a rock wall at the southeast spur of the peak.

Mountains of the Ross Dependency
Amundsen Coast